Bani Jaysh Al-Asfal is a sub-district located in As Sawd District, 'Amran Governorate, Yemen. Bani Jaysh Al-Asfal had a population of 1064 according to the 2004 census.

References 

Sub-districts in As Sawd District